Reza Mahmoudi (born 22 June 1979) is an Iranian footballer who plays for Saipa F.C. in the IPL.

Club career
Mahmoudi joined Saipa F.C. in 2008

Club career statistics

 Assist Goals

References

1979 births
Living people
Saipa F.C. players
Iranian footballers
Association football midfielders